Svetlana Aleksandrovna Fedotkina (born 22 July 1967) is a Russian speed skater who competed in the 1994 Winter Olympics.

She was born in Krasnoyarsk.

In 1994 she won the silver medal in the 1500 metres contest. In the 1000 metres event she finished eleventh and in the 500 metres competition she finished 20th.

External links
 

1967 births
Living people
Olympic speed skaters of Russia
Speed skaters at the 1994 Winter Olympics
Olympic silver medalists for Russia
Sportspeople from Krasnoyarsk
Olympic medalists in speed skating
Russian female speed skaters
Medalists at the 1994 Winter Olympics